The 1983 NCAA Division I women's volleyball tournament was the third year of the NCAA Women's Volleyball Championship. It began with 28 teams and ended on December 19 when Hawaii defeated UCLA 3 games to 0 in the NCAA championship match. Hawaii won their second straight title.

In the consolation match, Stanford defeated Pacific to claim third place.

The Final Four was held in Lexington, Kentucky at the Memorial Coliseum. The championship match attendance of 1,812 remains the lowest attendance ever for an NCAA national championship match.

Brackets

Northwest regional

Mideast regional

South regional

West regional

Final Four - Memorial Coliseum, Lexington, Kentucky

NCAA Tournament records

There are four NCAA tournament records that were set during the 1983 NCAA tournament that have not yet been broken.

Solo blocks, match (individual record) - Marsha Bond, Kentucky - 11 (vs. Hawaii)
Solo blocks, match (team record) - 25 (Kentucky vs. Hawaii)
Solo blocks, tournament (team record) - Hawaii, 35 (11 vs. Tennessee, 10 vs. Kentucky, 6 vs. Stanford, 8 vs. UCLA)
Hitting percentage, match (team record) - Stanford, .667 (vs. Pacific)

References

NCAA
NCAA Women's Volleyball Championship
Sports competitions in Lexington, Kentucky
NCAA Division I women's volleyball tournament
NCAA Division I women's volleyball tournament
Volleyball in Kentucky
Women's sports in Kentucky